Pewou Bestman (born July 10, 1975) is a retired Liberian professional football goalkeeper who represented Liberia national football team between 1988 and 2002.

References

External links 
 

1975 births
Living people
Liberian footballers
Liberian expatriate footballers
Liberia international footballers
Invincible Eleven players
FC Kochin players
Expatriate footballers in India
Liberian expatriate sportspeople in India
Association football goalkeepers
1996 African Cup of Nations players
2002 African Cup of Nations players